James Henderson (1867 – ?) was a Scottish footballer.

Henderson was born in Thornhill, Dumfries, and first played for the 5th Kirkcudbright Rifle Volunteers and then Rangers; he was a squad player in Rangers 1890–91 Scottish League-title winning season. In 1892 he moved south to London, signing for Woolwich Arsenal. An inside forward, he was a consistent goalscorer in Arsenal's last season before they joined the English Football League; having been boycotted by other sides for their turn to professionalism, these mainly consisted of friendlies and FA Cup matches.

Henderson was a regular in Arsenal's inaugural season in the Second Division, and scored 18 goals in 27 first-class games, finishing as Arsenal's top goalscorer; they finished 9th that season. However, the following season his goalscoring touch deserted him and he was released by the club in the summer of 1895, having played 47 League & Cup matches and scoring 30 goals in total. He played another 49 first-team matches and scored 30 goals in them. He returned to his native Scotland. His fate after that is unknown.

References

1867 births
People from Thornhill, Dumfries and Galloway
Scottish footballers
Association football forwards
Rangers F.C. players
Arsenal F.C. players
Footballers from Dumfries and Galloway
Year of death missing